Zackery Clay Ruhl better known as Zack is a personal fitness trainer from Texas. He was born with a medical condition which led to requirement of amputation of his both legs at the age of 2.

References 

1990s births
Living people
Year of birth uncertain
Place of birth missing (living people)
Sportspeople from Texas
American amputees
Sportspeople with limb difference
American disabled sportspeople